Jhal Bibri  is a village in Kapurthala district of Punjab State, India. The village is administrated by a Sarpanch, who is an elected representative.

Demography 
According to the report published by Census India in 2011, Jhal Bibri has 66 houses with the total population of 357 persons of which 188 are male and 169 females. Literacy rate of  Jhal Bibri is 79.69%, higher than the state average of 75.84%.  The population of children in the age group 0–6 years is 37 which is 10.36% of the total population.  Child sex ratio is approximately 762, lower than the state average of 846.

Population data

References

External links
  Villages in Kapurthala
 Kapurthala Villages List

Villages in Kapurthala district